Meromacroides is a monotypic genus of Afrotropical hoverfly from the family Syrphidae, in the order Diptera.

Species
Meromacroides meromacriformis (Bezzi, 1915)

References

Hoverfly genera
Diptera of Africa
Eristalinae
Taxa named by Charles Howard Curran
Monotypic Diptera genera